Alexander Vallaury (1850–1921) was a French-Ottoman architect, who founded architectural education and lectured in the School of Fine Arts in Constantinople (Istanbul), Ottoman Empire.

Biography
Vallaury was born in 1850 into a Levantine family in Istanbul. His father, Francesco Vallaury, was a renowned pastry chef, highly respected in court circles. Vallaury's nationality is not definitively known; however, he is assumed to have been of French extraction due to his affinity to French culture.

Between 1869 and 1878, Vallaury lived in Paris, France, where he studied architecture at the École nationale supérieure des Beaux-Arts. Returning to Istanbul in 1880, he met Osman Hamdi Bey, who was at that time curator of the newly established Imperial Museum ( - now the Istanbul Archaeology Museum), during an exhibition of his relief drawings of various architectural monuments. The two artists worked closely together in the fields of archaeology, museum work and education in fine arts.

Following the foundation of the first School of Fine Arts (now the Mimar Sinan Fine Arts University) in Turkey on January 1, 1882, Alexander Vallaury started working in the architecture department.  He lectured at the school for 25 years until his retirement in 1908.

Following the 1894 Istanbul earthquake, he was appointed to work on various commissions for city planning. Remembered by Osman Bey as the "City Architect" (Mimar-ı Şehir), Vallaury was almost invariably the architect chosen by the upper echelons of Ottoman high officials and French business circles while he worked at the School of Fine Arts. On some of these projects, he worked with the Italian architect Raimondo Tommaso D'Aronco, the chief architect at the sultan's palace.

In 1896, he was awarded France's Legion of Honour to go with many other medals and awards from the French and Ottoman governments.

Vallaury combined traditional Ottoman architecture with elements of Beaux-Arts architecture in the buildings he designed for members of the palace and for high officials in Istanbul. His architecture showed great variety, drawing on a broad spectrum of styles from Islamic-Ottoman synthesis to Neoclassical architecture. He used motifs from international Orientalism for some Neo-Renaissance and Neo-Ottoman structures which often incorporated Neo-Baroque and Art Nouveau details. His workshop was located at Saint Pierre Han in Galata.

Notable works
 Café Lebon (from 1940 on Café Marquise - Markiz Pastanesi) (1880) - Beyoğlu, Istanbul
 Décugis house (today Galata Antique Hotel) (1881) - Beyoğlu, Istanbul
 Hotel Pera Palace (1881-1891) -Beyoğlu, Istanbul
 Hidayet Mosque (1887) - Eminönü, Istanbul
 Imperial Ottoman Bank and Ottoman Tobacco Company headquarters (1892) - Karaköy, Istanbul
 Istanbul Archaeology Museum main building (1891-1907) - Sultanahmet, Istanbul
 Imperial Military School of Medicine (with Raimondo D'Aronco; later Haydarpaşa High School, today Marmara University Faculty of Law) (1893-1902) - Haydarpaşa, Istanbul
 Union Francaise building (in 2018, temporary home of İstanbul Modern) (1896) - Beyoğlu, Istanbul
 Ottoman Public Debt Administration building (later Istanbul High School) (1897) - Cağaloğlu, Istanbul
 Prinkipo Greek Orthodox Orphanage (1898-1899) - Büyükada, Istanbul
 Hezaren Han (1902) - Karaköy, Istanbul
 Ömer Abed Han (1902) - Karaköy, Istanbul
 Osman Reis Mosque (1903-1904) - Sarıyer, Istanbul
 Afif Pasha waterfront mansion (Muhayyeş Yalısı), (circa 1910) - Yeniköy, Istanbul
 Memorial to Sultan Abdülhamid on breakwater at Kadıköy

See also

 Legion of Honour
 List of Legion of Honour recipients by name (V)
 List of foreign recipients of the Legion of Honour by country
 Legion of Honour Museum

References

External links

 Biography at Museum of Architecture website
 Photo gallery at Museum of Architecture website

1850 births
Architects from Istanbul
Architects from the Ottoman Empire
19th-century French architects
20th-century French architects
Buildings and structures in Istanbul
Recipients of the Legion of Honour
1921 deaths
People from the Ottoman Empire of French descent
Art Nouveau architects
Ottoman expatriates in France
Academic staff of Mimar Sinan Fine Arts University